Yaginumena castrata is a species of comb-footed spider in the family Theridiidae. It is found in the far east of Russia, China, Japan, and Korea.

References

Theridiidae
Spiders described in 1906
Spiders of Asia
Arthropods of Russia
Arthropods of China
Arthropods of Japan
Arthropods of Korea